Geotrupes hornii, or Horn's earth boring beetle, is a species of earth-boring scarab beetle in the family Geotrupidae. It is found in the northeastern United States and southeastern Canada, most commonly between the months of June and September, peaking in August.

References

Further reading

 

Geotrupidae
Articles created by Qbugbot
Beetles described in 1888